Maks Barišič (born 6 March 1995) is a Slovenian footballer who plays as a winger for Koper.

Club career
On 31 January 2019, Barišič joined Padova on loan with an option to buy.

On 24 September 2020, his contract with Catania was terminated by mutual consent.

On 29 September 2020, he signed a two-year contract with Koper.

References

External links

1995 births
Living people
Footballers from Ljubljana
Slovenian footballers
Association football forwards
Association football wingers
Slovenia youth international footballers
Slovenian expatriate footballers
Slovenian expatriate sportspeople in Italy
Expatriate footballers in Italy
Catania S.S.D. players
A.C.R. Messina players
S.S. Fidelis Andria 1928 players
Calcio Padova players
FC Koper players
Serie B players
Serie C players
Slovenian PrvaLiga players